Tomasz Żelazowski (born September 22, 1974 in Opatów) is a Polish footballer who plays as a forward for KSZO Ostrowiec Świętokrzyski.

References

1974 births
KSZO Ostrowiec Świętokrzyski players
RKS Radomsko players
Living people
Polish footballers
People from Opatów
Sportspeople from Świętokrzyskie Voivodeship
Association football forwards